Koppio is a locality in the Australian state of South Australia located on the Eyre Peninsula about  west of the state capital of Adelaide and about  north of Port Lincoln, and within the Tod River catchment area. While long-established agricultural activities dominate (including sheep, cattle and buffalo grazing and wheat cropping) the region is also prospective for graphite and iron ore. The Koppio Smithy Museum is a local tourist attraction replete with buildings and artifacts representing the early pioneer heritage of Eyre Peninsula.

Mining and mineral exploration 

Companies actively exploring the area early in the 21st century included Eyre Iron Pty Ltd (a joint venture of Centrex Metals) and Lincoln Minerals. Eyre Iron's proposed Fusion Magnetite Project was the most advanced prospective mine development project in the area. Graphite was first mined in the area in 1866. The Koppio Graphite Mine originally operated in the early 1900s and was revisited between 1941 and 1944.

Koppio Smithy Museum 
The Koppio Smithy Museum is a  property managed by the National Trust of South Australia which features a collection of early colonial buildings and heritage artifacts collected from across Eyre Peninsula. The entrance is via the old Smithy's cottage, constructed by Tom Brennand after he migrated to the region from Lochiel in 1903. One of the museum's oddities is a replica World War I tank, which was abandoned in the sand dunes of Coffin Bay after its use in the feature film The Lighthorsemen. As of 2014, the museum is open to the public from 10 am until 5 pm Tuesday through Sunday and entry is $10 for adults and $4 for concessions.

Exhibits 
The museum includes the following exhibits:
 Blacksmith shop and two-bedroom cottage (restored)
 'Glenleigh' thatch cottage (1890)
 Koppio one-teacher schoolhouse (1934 to 1970) 
 A unique collection of very early Aboriginal artefacts
 Port Lincoln tailor shop (1910)
 Bank of Adelaide building
 White Flat Post Office (reportedly the smallest Post Office in South Australia), 
 Heritage Hall (Jericho family collection) 
 Display sheds featuring: tractors & farm machinery, stationary engines, shearing, grain story, hay story, vehicles 
 Print Room

Koppio Cemetery 
The Koppio Cemetery contains 36 plots, with the earliest grave dating from 1866.

Governance
Koppio is located within the federal Division of Grey, the state electoral district of Flinders and the local government area of the District Council of Tumby Bay.

See also
 List of cities and towns in South Australia
Hundred of Koppio

References 

Eyre Peninsula